Septimus Paul Kinneir (13 May 1871 – 16 October 1928) was an English cricketer who played in one Test match in 1911 against Australia in Sydney.  The tour had come as a reward for his most prolific season with the bat, when he scored 1,629 runs in 20 matches, including a career best 268 not out, at an average of 49.36.  He was named one of Wisden's cricketers of the year in 1912.  A left-handed batsman and occasional right arm bowler, Kinneir made his debut for Warwickshire in 1898 and played for the team until 1914.

References

1871 births
1928 deaths
England Test cricketers
English cricketers
Warwickshire cricketers
Marylebone Cricket Club cricketers
Players cricketers
Wiltshire cricketers
Wisden Cricketers of the Year